Amos Porter Cutting (1839–1896) was an American architect from Worcester, Massachusetts.

Cutting was born in Lyme, New Hampshire, on September 13, 1839. He came to Worcester in 1863, where he worked for Russ & Eddy, a manufacturer of millwork. He studied architecture in the evenings, and established himself as an architect in 1868. By 1876 he and John E. Holman (died 1879), who had been a draftsman with E. Boyden & Son, had established a firm together. This lasted until 1878, when Holman opened his own office. Cutting worked alone again until 1890, when he partnered with Walter R. Forbush, who had recently moved to Worcester from Cincinnati.

That firm only lasted the year, and they were working separately by 1891. He was again alone until 1895, when he decided to take an extended vacation to California, for his decaying health. At that time he made Elbridge S. Carleton and Frank H. Cutting, his son, members of Cutting, Carleton & Cutting. This firm survived until 1932, even without the elder Cutting.

He died February 6, 1896, while in Los Angeles.

Architectural works
Private practice, 1868-1875:
 Dresser House, Main & Central Sts., Southbridge, MA (1872) - Demolished.
 Plymouth Congregational Church, Pearl & Chestnut Sts., Worcester, MA (1873–74) - Demolished.
 First Congregational Church, 177 N. Main St., Concord, NH (1874) - Partially rebuilt after a 1935 fire.
 George M. Kimball House, 266 N. Main St., Concord, NH (1874–84)
 Franklin Wesson House, 8 Claremont St., Worcester, MA (1874–75)
 First Congregational Church, 25 Winthrop Ter., Warren, MA (1875)
Cutting & Holman, 1876-1878:
 Lyman School for Boys (Expansion), Westborough, MA (1876)
 Addison Macullar House, 2 Oread St., Worcester, MA (1876)
 Millbury Town Hall, 95 Elm St., Millbury, MA (1878–80) - Burned.
Private practice, 1878-1890:
 Uxbridge Town Hall, 21 S. Main St., Uxbridge, MA (1879) - Altered 1938.
 Edmund O. Bacon House, 49 Capron St., Uxbridge, MA (1881)
 Hotel Wilson, 6 N. Main St., Uxbridge, MA (1881)
 Alexander DeWitt House, 102 Russell St., Worcester, MA (1883) - Demolished.
 Leicester Inn, 1019 N. Main St., Leicester, MA (1885) - Demolished.
 New Hampshire Savings Bank Building, 116 N. Main St., Concord, NH (1885)
 William H. Sawyer House, 107 Lincoln St., Worcester, MA (1885) - Demolished.
 Herbert L. Stockwell House, 921 Main St., Worcester, MA (1885)
 Frederick G. Davis House, 78 Burncoat St., Worcester, MA (1888)
 Southbridge Town Hall, 41 Elm St., Southbridge, MA (1888)
 David Prouty High School, 195 Main St., Spencer, MA (1889)
 First Congregational Church, Main & School Sts., Newport, VT - Demolished.
 Trinity M. E. Church, 69 Main St., New Britain, CT (1889–91)
 Warren Public Library, 934 Main St., Warren, MA (1889–90)
 George H. Cutting House, 67 Cedar St., Worcester, MA (1890)
 Eagle Hotel (Remodeling), 110 N. Main St., Concord, NH (1890)
Cutting & Forbush, 1890:
 Daniel N. Bates House, 66 Cedar St., Worcester, MA (1890)
 Lothrop's Opera House, 17 Pleasant St., Worcester, MA (1890)
 Y. M. C. A. Building, 96 State St., Newburyport, MA (1890–91) - Burned 1987.
Private practice, 1891-1895:
 Epworth M. E. Church, 1555 Massachusetts Ave., Cambridge, MA (1891–93)
 New Hampshire State Library, 20 Park St., Concord, NH (1891–94)
 Centennial Home for the Aged, 96 Pleasant St., Concord, NH (1892)
 First Congregational Church, 1 Concord St., Nashua, NH (1893–94)
 Arthur M. Evans House, 84 Burncoat St., Worcester, MA (1894)
 Gale Library, 34 Main St., Northborough, MA (1894–95)
 Kellogg-Hubbard Library, 135 Main St., Montpelier, VT (1894–95)
 James C. Stewart House, 75 Lancaster St., Worcester, MA (1895) - Demolished.
Cutting, Carleton & Cutting, 1895-1896:
 Mathewson Street M. E. Church, 134 Mathewson St., Providence, RI (1895)
 Gilman Building, 215 Main St., Worcester, MA (1896) - Demolished.

Cutting also participated in, but lost, the 1895 design competition for the Worcester City Hall.

References

1839 births
1896 deaths
Architects from Worcester, Massachusetts
Architects from New Hampshire
19th-century American architects
People from Lyme, New Hampshire